Get well soon may refer to:

 "Get Well Soon" (song), a 2018 song by Ariana Grande
 Get Well Soon (band), a German band
 Get Well Soon (film), a 2014 French comedy film
 Get Well Soon (play), a play commissioned by Mikron Theatre Company for their 2018 season
 Get Well Soon (TV series), a British sitcom
 Get Well Soon, a 2001 American film starring Courteney Cox
Get Well Soon: History's Worst Plagues and the Heroes Who Fought Them, a 2017 book by Jennifer Wright
 Get Well Soon, a children's TV series on CBeebies